Neamblysomus is a genus of golden moles containing two species:

Gunning's golden mole (Neamblysomus gunningi)
Juliana's golden mole (Neamblysomus julianae)

References

Mammal genera
Afrosoricida